Massachusetts House of Representatives' 7th Essex district in the United States is one of 160 legislative districts included in the lower house of the Massachusetts General Court. It covers the city of Salem in Essex County. Democrat Manny Cruz of Salem has represented the district since 2023.

The current district geographic boundary overlaps with that of the Massachusetts Senate's 2nd Essex district.

Representatives
 Edward H. Pearce, circa 1858 
 John J. Babson, circa 1859 
 Jeremiah R. Cook, circa 1859 
 William A. Butler, circa 1888 
 Alfred Bradbury, circa 1920 
 William X. Wall, circa 1951 
 Michael J. Harrington, 1969
 Robert Ellis Cahill, circa 1971 
 John G. King, circa 1975 
 J. Michael Ruane, 1979–2005 
 John D. Keenan, 2005 – August 23, 2014
 Paul Tucker, 2015-2023
 Manny Cruz, 2023-current

Former locales
The district previously covered:
 Ipswich, circa 1872 
 Rowley, circa 1872

See also
 List of Massachusetts House of Representatives elections
 Other Essex County districts of the Massachusetts House of Representatives: 1st, 2nd, 3rd, 4th, 5th, 6th, 8th, 9th, 10th, 11th, 12th, 13th, 14th, 15th, 16th, 17th, 18th
 Essex County districts of the Massachusett Senate: 1st, 2nd, 3rd; 1st Essex and Middlesex; 2nd Essex and Middlesex
 List of Massachusetts General Courts
 List of former districts of the Massachusetts House of Representatives

Images

References

External links
 Ballotpedia
  (State House district information based on U.S. Census Bureau's American Community Survey).
 League of Women Voters - Salem

House
Government of Essex County, Massachusetts